The Foreign Investment Review Agency (FIRA) was established by the Canadian Parliament in 1973 to ensure that the foreign acquisition and establishment of businesses in Canada was beneficial to the country. The Foreign Investment Review Act that created the agency was the culmination of a series of government reports and debates. The 1957 report of the Royal Commission on Canada's Economic Prospects (known as the Gordon Commission) firmly planted foreign investment on the political agenda. Next, the 1968 Watkins report (known formally as Foreign Ownership and the Structure of Canadian Industry), called for a national policy capable of handling Canada's interests in the age of the multinational corporation.

In 1970, the Wahn Report expanded the idea of a screening process, and finally the Gray report (known officially as Foreign Direct Investment in Canada) provided the rationale and framework for the agency. FIRA was placed under the jurisdiction of the Department of Industry and later, when it was merged with the Department of Trade and Commerce, under the newly named Department of Industry, Trade and Commerce. As outlined in section 2(2) of the act, takeovers were assessed based on their contribution to job creation, Canadian participation in management, competition with existing industries, new technology, and compatibility with federal and provincial economic policies.

When Prime Minister Brian Mulroney came to office in 1985, the agency was renamed Investment Canada and its mandate drastically reduced.

Further reading 
 Azzi, Stephen. Walter Gordon and the Rise of Canadian Nationalism. Montreal and Kingston: McGill-Queen's University Press, 1999.
 Bliss, Michael. "Founding FIRA: The Historical Background." In Foreign Investment Review Law in Canada, edited by James M. Spence and William P. Rosenfeld, 1-11. Toronto: Butterworths, 1984.
 English, John. Just Watch Me: The Life of Pierre Elliott Trudeau 1968-2000. Toronto: Alfred A. Knopf Canada, 2009.
 Gillespie, Alastair W., with Irene Sage. Made in Canada: A Businessman’s Adventures in Politics. [Montreal]: Robin Brass Studio, 2009.
 Globerman, Steven. "Canada’s Foreign Investment Review Agency and the Direct Investment Process in Canada." Canadian Public Administration 27, no. 3 (1984): 313–328.
 Levitt, Kari. Silent Surrender: The Multinational Corporation in Canada. Toronto: Macmillan, 1970.
 Rotstein, Abraham, and Gary Lax. Getting It Back: A Program for Canadian Independence. Toronto: Clarke, Irwin, 1974.
 Safarian, A. E. Foreign Ownership of Canadian Industry. 2nd ed. Toronto: University of Toronto Press, 1973.

Federal departments and agencies of Canada
Investment promotion agencies
Foreign relations of Canada
Pierre Trudeau
Foreign trade of Canada
Government agencies established in 1973
1973 establishments in Canada